Larry Hardy (born July 9, 1956) is a retired American football tight end who played eight seasons in the NFL for the New Orleans Saints.  He played college football at Jackson State University.

1956 births
Living people
American football tight ends
Jackson State Tigers football players
New Orleans Saints players
People from Mendenhall, Mississippi